"Set My World on Fire" is a song by British pop rock band The Feeling. Released in May 2011, it is the lead single and opening track of their third album Together We Were Made.

Critical reception
Robert Leedham for Drowned in Sound gave a mixed response, saying he "understand[s] why [it] was chosen as a lead single: its placement at the time of writing on Radio 2's 'A List' probably justifies the decision. As a song though, it's wet."

Chart performance
The single peaked at #128 in the UK Singles Chart. This compares to the #9 peak position of "I Thought It Was Over", the lead single for the band's previous album Join With Us. It did not chart in any other countries, except for Scotland where it peaked at #92.

References 

2011 singles
The Feeling songs
2011 songs
Island Records singles
Songs written by Dan Gillespie Sells
Songs written by Richard Jones (The Feeling)
Songs written by Kevin Jeremiah
Songs written by Ciaran Jeremiah
Songs written by Paul Stewart (musician)